Namban is a small locality in Western Australia with the post code 6512. It is north of Moora, Western Australia, and south-east of the Watheroo National Park.

References

Wheatbelt (Western Australia)